Acleris baleina is a species of moth of the family Tortricidae. It is found in Ethiopia, where it is only known from the Bale Mountains.

The wingspan is about 19 mm. The ground colour of the forewings is ferruginous, strigulated (finely streaked) with brown. The hindwings are grey.

Etymology
The species name refers to the Bale Mountains, the type locality.

References

baleina
Endemic fauna of Ethiopia
Lepidoptera of Ethiopia
Moths of Africa
Bale Mountains
Moths described in 2010